There are twelve stadiums in use by South Atlantic League baseball teams. The oldest stadium is McCormick Field (1924) in Asheville, North Carolina, home of the Asheville Tourists. The newest stadium is Truist Stadium (2010) in Winston-Salem, North Carolina, home of the Winston-Salem Dash. One stadium was built in the 1920s, three in the 1990s, seven in the 2000s, and one in the 2010s. The highest seating capacity is 8,000 at ShoreTown Ballpark in Lakewood, New Jersey, where the Jersey Shore BlueClaws play. The lowest capacity is 4,000 at McCormick Field.

Stadiums

Map

Gallery

See also

List of High-A baseball stadiums
List of Midwest League stadiums
List of Northwest League stadiums

References

General reference

External links

 
South Atlantic League
South Atlantic League stadiums